WOLF-TV (channel 56) is a television station licensed to Hazleton, Pennsylvania, United States, serving Northeastern Pennsylvania as an affiliate of the Fox network. It is the flagship property of locally based New Age Media, LLC, and is co-owned with Williamsport-licensed MyNetworkTV affiliate WQMY (channel 53); New Age also provides certain services to Scranton-licensed CW affiliate WSWB (channel 38) under a management services agreement (MSA) with MPS Media. All three stations, in turn, are operated under a master service agreement by the Sinclair Broadcast Group. The stations share studios on PA 315 in the Fox Hill section of Plains Township; WOLF-TV's transmitter is located at the Penobscot Knob antenna farm near Mountain Top. However, newscasts have originated from the facilities of sister station and CBS affiliate WSBT-TV in South Bend, Indiana since January 2017.

History
The Federal Communications Commission (FCC) granted an original construction permit for Hazleton's first full-service television station on September 30, 1982. The new station, given the call letters WERF, was owned by James Oyster and was to broadcast from a tower south of the city. At that location, the station could serve its city of license but not the main cities in the market, Scranton and Wilkes-Barre. In April 1983, WERF applied to move its transmitter to the Penobscot Knob antenna farm near Mountaintop where WNEP-TV (channel 16), WDAU-TV (channel 22, now WYOU), WBRE-TV (channel 28), and WVIA-TV (channel 44) also housed their transmitters. The application was denied, however.

Oyster changed the station's call letters to WWLF-TV on July 25, 1984, then sold the construction permit to Hazleton TV Associates on December 13. Two months later on February 20, 1985, the station was sold again, this time to Scranton TV Partners who completed construction of the station and brought it on-air on June 6. WWLF was a satellite of co-owned WOLF-TV in Scranton which was then on UHF channel 38 and was an independent station. That station had just begun broadcasting itself on June 3. WWLF, as a satellite of WOLF-TV, was independent for a little more than a year. On October 9, 1986, it became a charter affiliate of Fox. In 1988, WWLF moved to a new transmitter on Nescopeck Mountain near the junction of I-80 and PA 93 but remained a satellite of WOLF-TV.

On April 27, 1993, WWLF was sold to Pegasus Television and the new owners were able to accomplish something that the station's original owner could not: get permission to move the transmitter to the antenna farm at Penobscot Knob. The completion of the new transmitter ushered in a new era for WWLF. On November 1, 1998, Pegasus moved the WOLF-TV call sign to channel 56 and made it the sole outlet for Fox programming in Northeast Pennsylvania. It changed the call letters of channel 38 to WSWB and made that station an affiliate of The WB. That station's owners had sought for many years to move either the channel 38 or channel 56 transmitters to Penobscot Knob.

On January 4, 2007, WOLF-TV, along with most of the Pegasus stations, was sold to investment group CP Media, LLC with the sale consummated on March 31. For the first time in its history, the station was no longer co-owned with WSWB. However, the new owners of that station signed a local marketing agreement (LMA) with CP Media meaning that the stations continue to be commonly operated. Eventually, CP Media formed a new broadcasting group, New Age Media. More recently, WOLF-TV launched a new website using the Fox owned-and-operated station platform licensed from Fox Television Stations' interactive division; this lasted until some time in 2010 or 2011 when WorldNow took over the operation of the WOLF-TV web site. On December 4, 2011, the station's transmitter was damaged and for the next month WOLF-TV was carried on WBRE's channel 28.2 subchannel.

On September 25, 2013, New Age Media announced that it would sell most of its stations, including WOLF-TV and WQMY, to the Sinclair Broadcast Group. Concurrently, sister station WSWB was to be sold by MPS Media to Cunningham Broadcasting, while continuing to be operated by WOLF-TV. On October 31, 2014, New Age Media requested the dismissal of its application to sell WOLF-TV; the next day, Sinclair purchased the non-license assets of the stations it planned to buy from New Age Media and began operating them through a master service agreement.

On May 8, 2017, Sinclair entered into an agreement to acquire Chicago-based Tribune Media – which, through a shared services agreement with owner Dreamcatcher Broadcasting, has operated WNEP-TV since December 2013 – for $3.9 billion, plus the assumption of $2.7 billion in debt held by Tribune. The complicated SSA relationships that Sinclair has in the Scranton–Wilkes–Barre market with WOLF, WSWB and WQMY – the former two of which are currently the only legal television duopoly in the market – created an ownership entanglement, as WNEP and WOLF rank among the market's four highest-rated stations, and the market has too few independently owned full-power stations to permit a second legal duopoly in any event. (Sinclair CEO Christopher Ripley cited Scranton–Wilkes–Barre as one of three markets, out of fourteen where ownership conflicts exist between the two groups, where the proposed acquisition would likely result in divestitures). To alleviate some of the regulatory issues that the deal incurred by selling certain stations to both independent and affiliated third-party companies, on April 24, 2018, Sinclair announced that it would sell the non-license assets of WOLF-TV, WQMY, and WSWB and the full assets of eight other stations – Sinclair-operated KOKH-TV in Oklahoma City, WRLH-TV in Richmond, KDSM-TV in Des Moines and WXLV-TV in Greensboro/Winston-Salem/High Point, and Tribune-owned WPMT in Harrisburg and WXMI in Grand Rapids – to Standard Media Group (an independent broadcast holding company formed by private equity firm Standard General to assume ownership of and absolve ownership conflicts involving the aforementioned stations) for $441.1 million. Sinclair concurrently exercised its option to buy WOLF-TV and WQMY – the latter of which, for regulatory purposes, will continue to be licensed as a satellite of WOLF-TV – to allow Standard Media Group to acquire the stations outright.

Three weeks after the FCC's July 18 vote to have the deal reviewed by an administrative law judge amid "serious concerns" about Sinclair's forthrightness in its applications to sell certain conflict properties, on August 9, 2018, Tribune announced it would terminate the Sinclair deal, intending to seek other M&A opportunities. Tribune also filed a breach of contract lawsuit in the Delaware Chancery Court, alleging that Sinclair engaged in protracted negotiations with the FCC and the DOJ over regulatory issues, refused to sell stations in markets where it already had properties, and proposed divestitures to parties with ties to Sinclair executive chair David D. Smith that were rejected or highly subject to rejection to maintain control over stations it was required to sell. The termination of the Sinclair sale agreement places uncertainty for the future of Standard Media's purchases of WOLF/WQMY/WSWB and the other four Tribune- and Sinclair-operated stations included in that deal, which were predicated on the closure of the Sinclair–Tribune merger.

Programming

Syndicated programming
Syndicated programming on WOLF-TV includes Dr. Phil, The Doctors, The Steve Wilkos Show, and Maury among others.

Newscasts

Fox required most of its affiliates to begin offering local news in 1990 in order to help the fledgling network. However, WOLF's facilities have never been large enough to accommodate an in-house news department. Rather than risk disaffiliation, what is now WSWB entered into a news share agreement with ABC affiliate WNEP-TV (then owned by The New York Times Company) in 1991. The outsourcing arrangement resulted in one of the nation's first prime time newscasts to debut known as Newswatch 16 at 10 on Fox 38. The show originated from WNEP's facility on Montage Mountain Road in Moosic featuring the ABC outlet's on-air personnel. When channel 56 became the sole Fox outlet for the area in 1998, the newscasts stayed here as well under the title of Fox 56 News at 10, with a secondary title of Newswatch 16 at 10 on Fox 56.

In November 2009, it was announced WNEP would move its production of the news at 10 to a second digital subchannel called "WNEP 2" which had recently gained Retro Television Network (RTV) affiliation. That happened December 31 of that year after which WOLF-TV and NBC affiliate WBRE-TV (owned by the Nexstar Broadcasting Group) entered into a new outsourcing agreement. After taking over production of nightly prime time newscasts on WOLF-TV starting New Year's Day 2010, WBRE expanded the show to an hour each night and changed the title to Fox 56 News First at 10.

The program later originated from a secondary set at the NBC affiliate's studios on South Franklin Street in Downtown Wilkes-Barre. The space had previously been used to produce separate newscasts on CBS affiliate WYOU. On April 2, 2012, WBRE became the market's second television station to upgrade local news to high definition level. The WOLF-TV shows were included in the upgrade complete with an updated secondary set at WBRE's studios. As was the case with the WNEP-produced broadcasts, if there were network obligations or overruns of Fox programming that prevent WOLF-TV from showing the WBRE program, it was aired on WSWB instead. Its website posts video of the first segment of Fox 56 News First at 10 and the weather forecast segment. Along with its main studios, WBRE operates news bureaus in Scranton (on Lackawanna Avenue), Stroudsburg (Main Street), Williamsport (on Pine Street), and Hazleton (East 10th Street).

On October 5, 2016, the Hazleton Standard-Speaker reported that WOLF-TV would end its outsourcing agreement with WBRE on December 31, and is beginning to hire staff for a new in-house news department. The newscast began on January 1, 2017, using local reporting staff, with anchors originating from a secondary set at Sinclair's CBS affiliate WSBT-TV in South Bend, Indiana. The anchors for WOLF's 10 p.m. show also anchor the 6 p.m. and 11 p.m. newscasts for Toledo, Ohio NBC affiliate WNWO-TV.

Technical information

Subchannels
The station's digital signal is multiplexed:

WQMY cannot be received over-the-air in the Scranton and Wilkes-Barre areas due to its transmitter being in Williamsport, so it can be seen on WOLF-DT3.

Analog-to-digital conversion
WOLF-TV shut down its analog signal, over UHF channel 56, on January 19, 2009. The station's digital signal remained on its pre-transition UHF channel 45. Through the use of PSIP, digital television receivers display the station's virtual channel as its former UHF analog channel 56, which was among the high band UHF channels (52-69) that were removed from broadcasting use as a result of the transition.

Translators
WOLF-TV serves one of the largest geographic markets in the country. This area is very mountainous making UHF reception difficult. However, the station is in unique situation since Scranton and Wilkes-Barre is a "UHF Island". As a result, it operates a digital translator to repeat its signal. W24DB-D on UHF channel 24 has a transmitter northwest of Scranton and I-476 in Lackawanna County. WOLF-TV also operates a digital replacement translator on UHF channel 27 in Waymart. This channel exists because wind turbines run by NextEra Energy Resources at the Waymart Wind Farm interfere with the transmission of full-power television signals.

References

External links
 WOLF-TV website
 WQMY website
 WSWB website

OLF-TV
Fox network affiliates
Television channels and stations established in 1985
1985 establishments in Pennsylvania
Sinclair Broadcast Group
Low-power television stations in the United States